Birdsville is a rural town and locality in the Shire of Diamantina, Queensland, Australia. It is a popular tourist destination with many people using it as a starting point across the Simpson Desert.

Betoota is a ghost town within the east of the locality.

Geography

Birdsville is on the edge of the Simpson Desert, approximately 174 km east of Poeppel Corner.

Thundahpurty Waterhole is on the river in the east of the locality.

The Birdsville Track extends  from Marree in South Australia before ending at Birdsville; the road continues north as the Eyre Developmental Road to Bedourie. The Birdsville Developmental Road travels east from the town towards Windorah. A popular route across the Simpson Desert goes from Birdsville to Mt Dare via the French Line. The Line is an unsealed track built in the early 1960s by French Petroleum for oil exploration purposes.

Birdsville Airport is immediately north-west of the town. It is operated by the Diamantina Shire Council.

Almost all the buildings in the town are of local sandstone, there being no local timber available. Distance and the lack of good access roads or a railway create prohibitively high transportation costs, so imported building materials are kept to a minimum.

Birdsville has the following mountains:

 Carloowattie Hill
 Grahams Bluff
 Louies Hill 
 Mount Hal 
 Mount Leonard
 Mount Lewis 
 Mount Oakes 
 One Tree Hill
 Pig Hill 
 Square Hill 
 Squaretop Hill

History
Birdsville is located on land traditionally owned by the Wongkanguru people, in the Channel Country of Central West Queensland, Australia.

Long before Birdsville was established by British colonists, the region in which it is situated was occupied by indigenous Australians, speakers of the Wangkangurru language (also known as Arabana/Wangkangurru, Wangganguru, Wanggangurru or Wongkangurru), whose extent ranged from Birdsville south towards Innamincka and Lake Eyre, including the modern local government areas of the Shire of Diamantina as well as the Outback Communities Authority of South Australia.

Although British explorers had passed through the Diamantina district in the 1840s and early 1860s, pastoralists did not occupy this semi-arid region until the mid-1870s. Brothers Hector and Norman Wilson formed "The Bluff" property around the present site of Birdsville in 1875 as an outpost of their massive Coongy station across the border in South Australia. The Bluff property was also known as Salmonville. Nearby pastoral stations of Annandale, Pandie Pandie, Glengyle and Roseberth were taken up in 1876; and Carcoory in 1877.

Conflict in the region during this time included several large massacres of the resident Aboriginal people being perpetrated. For instance in 1879, Sub-Inspectors Henry Kaye and Henry Gough of the Native Police, together with troopers and stockmen from The Bluff and other properties, conducted a sweeping patrol for the perpetrators of the murder of a stockman. They came across two camps of Aboriginal people and dispersed them. A pastoralist on the nearby Warburton Creek reported to the Police Commissioner in Adelaide that 67 people were killed in these raids and that survivors from the violence had fled to his property.

There are a number of different theories as to the origin of the name Birdsville. One is that the name was suggested by Robert Frew, owner of Pandie Pandie Station, who also had a store and shop at the Diamantina Crossing, in reference to the prolific bird life in the district. The other is that a store was established by Percy Bird and George Field and they called it Birdfield. However, in 1882, G. and R. Wills, of Adelaide, misaddressed a consignment of goods as going to Birdsville and that name stuck. Another is that a man named Burt established a store and called it Burtsville which corrupted to Birdsville. Whatever its origin, by 1882, the name Birdsville was in common use. The name was adopted in the 1885 survey and was formalised at the proclamation of town in 1887.

In 1881, Hector and Norman Wilson, sold The Bluff (Salmonville) property for £19,000. Outside of their pastoral business, the brothers resided in Melbourne where they were the driving force behind the establishment of the Melbourne Racing Club, the Coongy Cup and the Caulfield Cup.

In the early 1880s the towns of Birdsville and Bedourie were established to service the newly taken up pastoral holdings of the Diamantina. Reputedly, a merchant named Matthew Flynn, who carried stores for the stations, built a rough depot in the late 1870s at the site of the present town of Birdsville, then known as the Diamantina Crossing,  on the stock route from Boulia south to Adelaide. By mid-1885, when the township of Birdsville was officially surveyed, a number of buildings had been erected at the Diamantina Crossing, including a police lock-up (1883), Groth's Royal Hotel, William Blair's Birdsville Hotel, Curtain's Tattersalls Hotel, and at least 3 stores and 1 shop.

When it was proclaimed, the town had three hotels, two stores, a customs house for interstate trade, a police station and a large collection of commercial buildings.

Diamantina Shire was established in 1883, and its headquarters were at Birdsville until moved to Bedourie in 1953.  Birdsville Post Office opened on 1 January 1883.

Birdsville, over 1,500 km west of Brisbane and 10 km north of the Queensland-South Australian border, developed as an administrative centre for police and border customs. Birdsville is located at the border of South Australia and Queensland to collect tolls from the droves of cattle being moved interstate. Nearly all the trade of the town was with Adelaide, and it became an important marshalling point for cattle being driven south to markets in South Australia. By 1889 the population of Birdsville was 110, and the town had 2 general stores, 3 hotels, a police station, school, 2 blacksmith shops, 2 bakers, a cordial manufacturer, bootmaker, saddler, auctioneer & commission agent, and a number of residences. The population peaked in 1895 at 220.

Birdsville State School opened on 14 August 1899. The school closed in 1948 and has subsequently reopened.

Circa 1900, Birdsville had a population of over 300. It had three hotels, a cordial factory, blacksmith store, market gardens, police and customs facilities but after Federation in 1901, the tolls were abolished and the town fell into decline to about 50 people throughout the 1950s. Livestock trade kept the region alive and since then tourism has joined cattle as the major industry in the area.

Tom Kruse operated the Birdsville Track mail run from 1936 to 1957, driving his Leyland Badger truck. Each trip would take two weeks and Kruse regularly had to manage break-downs, flooding creeks and rivers, and getting bogged in desert dunes.

In 2007, there was just one hotel serving canned or bottled beer, a library, a visitor information centre, a museum and a hospital.

In the ,the locality of Birdsville had a population of 140 people.  86.1% of people were born in Australia and 94.2% of people only spoke English at home.

Heritage listings 
Birdsville has a number of heritage-listed sites, including:
 former Australian Inland Mission Hospital, Adelaide Street
 Birdsville Courthouse, Adelaide Street
 former Royal Hotel, Adelaide Street
 Birdsville Hotel, Burt Street
 Carcory Homestead Ruin, Eyre Developmental Road
 Burke and Wills "Plant Camp", in the north of the locality
 Kidman's Tree of Knowledge, Glengyle Station, Bedourie

Education
Birdsville State School is a government primary (Early Childhood-6) school for boys and girls at Adelaide Street. In 2018, the school had an enrolment of 7 students with 2 teachers and 1 non-teaching staff.

There is no secondary school in Birdsville or nearby. Distance education and boarding school are options.

Facilities

Birdsville has an 80 kW geothermal power station, the only one of its type in Australia. The geothermal plant produces around one third of the town's electricity. The water (once cooled) is also the source of the town's drinking water. A plan by Ergon Energy to expand the 80 kW power plant to completely meet Birdsville's electricity requirements was shelved, in favour of increasing the use of solar power and battery storage.

Birdsville Primary Health Care Centre is at 31 Adelaide Street. It provides emergency and primary care by nursing staff with doctors' appointments provided by the Royal Flying Doctor Service. It also provides ambulance services.

Birdsville has the following emergency services:

 Birdsville Police Station, Mcdonald Street

 Birdsville SES Facility, Graham Street

Birdsville Cemetery is on Cemetery Road west of the town. It is operated by the Diamantina Shire Council.

Amenities 
Birdsville Library is at 29 Burt Street and is operated by the Diamantina Shire Council.

The town is situated near a billabong. A pontoon  was built at Burt Street on the north bank of the billabong to facilitate swimming and non-powered boating activities. It is managed by the Diamantina Shire Council. In 2012, the billabong became home to a stray freshwater crocodile, which was subsequently removed and relocated by park ranger Don Rowlands.

Events 
The annual Birdsville Races are held in September in aid of the Royal Flying Doctor Service. The town's tiny population is augmented by between 7000 and 9000 people for the two-day event, and hundreds of aircraft fill the town's  airstrip. In 2010, the races were cancelled for the first time in the event's history due to rain.

Attendees camp at the site.

The Simpson Desert Bike Challenge also traditionally finishes in Birdsville in October every year.

The Big Red Run is held at Birdsville during the winter tourist season. It was last held in 2018.

Climate
Birdsville has a hot desert climate (BWh in the Köppen climate classification) with an average of only 22 days of rain a year. Summers are extremely hot and dry, with winters being mild to warm. The median annual rainfall at Birdsville is  The actual amount of rain which falls is highly variable, for example, in 1914 just  was recorded while  fell in 1917. Dust storms are most likely during periods of strong wind which typically occur in spring. Birdsville has recorded the highest confirmed temperature in the state of Queensland, with  having been recorded on 24 December 1972.

Birdsville disease
Birdsville disease is an illness observed in horses, caused by eating the native plant Birdsville indigo (Indigofera linnaei) which contains natural toxins including the neurotoxin 3 nitropropionic acid (3-NPA). The affected horses exhibit weakness and lack of coordination; it can be fatal. It does not appear to affect cattle. Although it is not unique to Birdsville, the condition was first observed in the Birdsville district in May 1886. While there were many theories about the cause of the disease including plants, worms and sunstroke, it was not until 1950 that researchers identified the precise cause. Mildly affected horses can recover with a regimen of drenching with gelatine and feeding a diet high in arginine but euthanasia is recommended for severely affected horses. As there is no cure, preventing horses from grazing on indigo is recommended.

In popular culture
 Elizabeth Haran's 2004 novel Stars in the Southern Sky is set in the town (though it is renamed to Kangaroo Crossing).
 The 2014 British comedy film The Inbetweeners 2 had scenes set in the town.
 The 1983 novel 'The Film-Makers' by Kenneth and Kerry Cook is partially set in Birdsville.
Slim Dusty sang a song about the Birdsville Pub (hotel) called "Where Country Is".
The 1954 Film The Back of Beyond was about the mail run to Birdsville.
Oliver Herbrichs 1982 documentary film "Dead Heart" is about Birdsville and the centenary horse race.

See also
 List of extreme temperatures in Australia

References

External links

 
Birdsville Internet Exchange

Towns in Queensland
1887 establishments in Australia
Populated places established in 1887
Shire of Diamantina
Birdsville, Queensland
Localities in Queensland